National Bank of Egypt Sporting Club, is an Egyptian football club based in Cairo, Egypt. The club is related to the National Bank of Egypt which was founded in June 1898.

National Bank of Egypt SC is mainly known for its professional football team, which currently plays in the Egyptian Premier League, the highest league in the Egyptian football league system.

History
The club was founded in 1951. In 2018–19 season, they finished 2nd in Third Division Promotion Group B to compete at the 2019–20 Egyptian Second Division, where they finished 1st in Group A, to be promoted to the 2020–21 Egyptian Premier League for the first time in their history.

Players

Current squad

Out on loan

References

Egyptian Second Division
Football clubs in Cairo
Financial services association football clubs in Egypt
Association football clubs established in 1951
1951 establishments in Egypt